The Petit Musée de l'Argenterie is a privately operated museum of decorative arts made of silver located within the  Ateliers du Cuivre et de l'Argent, Viaduc des Arts, 109-113, Avenue Daumesnil, Paris, France. The museum is located in the Bercy district in the 12th arrondissement. The nearest Paris Métro stop is Reuilly-Diderot on Line 1 and Line 8. It is open daily except Sundays and holidays; an admission fee is charged.

The museum contains a small collection of silver objects for tableware, wine, tea, tobacco, and fashion, such as a combined fork-knife for one-armed people, chop holders, marrow pullers, moustache spoons, pomanders, etc.

See also 
 List of museums in Paris

References 
 Paris.org: Petit Musée de l'Argenterie
 Mairie 12 description (French)
 Michael Zils, Museums of the World, K.G. Saur, 2003. .

Argenterie, Petitmusee
Decorative arts museums in France
Buildings and structures in the 12th arrondissement of Paris